Kȁčić is a Croatian surname. It is chiefly distributed in the city of Split, and the area of southern and central Dalmatia. Etymologically it derives from the word kača "snake".

It may refer to:
 Kačić noble family, which includes medieval Hungarian branch Kacsics
 Andrija Kačić Miošić (1704–1760), Croatian poet and Franciscan friar
 Hrvoje Kačić (born 1932), former Croatian water polo player, academician and politician
 Miro Kačić (1946–2001), Croatian linguist
 Igor Kačić (1975–1991), youngest victim of the Vukovar massacre

 
Croatian surnames